The women's Jianshu / Qiangshu all-round competition at the 2010 Asian Games in Guangzhou, China was held on 14 November at the Nansha Gymnasium.

Schedule
All times are China Standard Time (UTC+08:00)

Results

References

External links
Official website

Women's jianshu